This is a list of episodes from the television series Grand Designs and its spin-offs Grand Designs Indoors, Grand Designs Abroad, and Grand Designs Trade Secrets.

Grand Designs (1999–present)
The way the episodes have been released on DVD differs slightly to the order they were aired on TV. The episode guide below shows the episodes as they aired with all the revisited versions also included. The DVD releases slightly reorder some of the episodes in each series and instead of the full revisited shows they simply have the ten minutes of footage that differs from the original broadcast included for the episodes on the disc.

Series overview

Episodes

Series 1 (1999)

Series 2 (2001–02)

Series 3 (2003)

Series 4 (2004)

Series 5 (2005)

Series 6 (2006)

Series 7 (2007)

Series 8 (2008)

Series 9 (2009)

Series 10 (2010)

Series 11 (2011)

Series 12 (2012)

Series 13 (2013)

Series 14 (2014)

Series 15 (2015)

Series 16 (2015)

Series 17 (2016)

2017 Special

Series 18 (2017)

Series 19 (2018)

Series 20 (2019)

Series 21 (2021)

Series 22 (2021)

Series 23 (2022)

Grand Designs Indoors (2001)

Grand Designs Abroad (2004)

Grand Designs Trade Secrets (2007–2008)

Series 1 (2007)

Series 2 (2008)

Kevin's Grand Design (2011)

Kevin's Grandest Design (2019)

Grand Designs: The Streets (2019-22)

Series 1 (2019)
The spin-off The Streets started in 2019

Series 2 (2022)

See also
 Grand Designs Australia
 Grand Designs New Zealand
 Kevin McCloud's Man Made Home

References

External links
 EpGuides Listing of Grand Designs entire run

Grand Designs